SS Tamahoko Maru was a Japanese passenger-cargo ship, used as a hell ship, which was torpedoed by submarine  on 24 June 1944, carrying 772 Allied POWs of which 560 died.

Service history
Tamahoko Maru sailed on 20 June 1944 with 772 POWs (197 British, 42 American, 258 Australian and 281 Dutch) from Takao for Moji in convoy HO-02. There were also some 500 Japanese soldiers on board.    

An escort picked up the Japanese survivors and left the POWs in the water, to be picked up the next morning by a small whaling ship, which brought 212 survivors to Nagasaki. They spent the rest of the war in the Fukuoka 14 prison camp. The other 560 POWs, 35 crewmen and an unknown number of Japanese soldiers were lost.

References

External links
TAMAHOKO MARU by POW Research Network Japan

1919 ships
Ships sunk by American submarines
Maritime incidents in June 1944
Ships built by IHI Corporation
World War II shipwrecks in the Pacific Ocean